Gary Williams (born 17 June 1960) is a former footballer who played as a right-back. He played for Aston Villa and was part of their European Cup victory in 1982. He also played for Walsall, Leeds United, Watford and Bradford City.

Honours
Aston Villa
 Football League First Division: 1980–81
 FA Charity Shield: 1981 (shared) 
 European Cup: 1981–82
 European Super Cup: 1982
 Intercontinental Cup runner-up: 1982

References

External links

Gary Williams Aston Villa stats at Sporting-Heroes.net
Gary Williams Leeds United stats at Sporting-Heroes.net
Gary Williams career stats at Leeds-Fans.org.uk

1960 births
Living people
English footballers
Aston Villa F.C. players
Walsall F.C. players
Leeds United F.C. players
Watford F.C. players
Bradford City A.F.C. players
English Football League players
Association football defenders